Don Khon, is an island in the Mekong River in the Si Phan Don ("Four Thousand Islands") archipelago in Champasak Province of southern Laos.

History
The Don Det–Don Khon railway was a -long narrow-gauge portage railway on the islands of Don Khon and Don Det, opened in 1893 to transport vessels, freight, and passengers along the Mekong River, and closed since the 1940s.

Geography
Don Khon is linked to its twin island Don Det by a bridge (Don Det–Don Khon railway).

There are two Buddhist temples, a primary school and a college on the island.

Climate
Don Khon features a tropical wet and dry climate. While the city is generally very warm throughout the year, it is noticeably cooler during December and January. Don Khon also experiences wet and dry seasons, with the wet season from April until October, and the dry season during the remaining five months. Temperatures range from 15°C to 38°C.

Gallery

References

External links

Populated places in Champasak Province
Populated places on the Mekong River